Golopo Nemba Bambara (born May 8, 1986 in Garoua) is a professional Cameroonian  footballer currently playing for Racing Club Bafoussam.

External links
Profile and Pictures - www.cotonsport.com

1986 births
Living people
Cameroonian footballers
Coton Sport FC de Garoua players
Association football goalkeepers